Delaware Valley High School (DVHS) is a for-profit company and private school operating the Bucks Campus in Warminster Heights, a community in Warminster Township in Bucks County, Pennsylvania.

Historically, Delaware Valley High School was a system of private schools in Greater Philadelphia. Previously, the school system had its administrative offices in Suite 1900 at Two Logan Square in Center City Philadelphia. In addition to the Bucks Campus, it previously operated DVHS Kelly in Northwest Philadelphia. As of 2012 David T. Shulick, a lawyer, owned the school system. He controlled it through Unique Educational Experiences Inc. and Shulick's law office was used as the headquarters of that company.

History
The school was first established as a for-profit private school in 1969. Its first campus was in Northeast Philadelphia on Bustleton Avenue and it offered class credit to students from area high schools who had difficulty in school. The schools which these students attended included Lincoln High School and George Washington High School.

Beginning around 2002 the School District of Philadelphia began contracting with DVHS. The district sends students at risk of dropping out and students with discipline problems to DVHS schools. In 2012 the district paid DVHS $4.1 million to operate two schools.

By 2012 the system had four alternative schools with 50 employees in the administrative and teaching sectors. By that year, U.S. federal authorities began investigating payments from Delaware Valley High School to the son of Congressman Chaka Fattah. In July 2012 the school laid off those 50 employees.

In 2015, its Warminster Heights campus closed.

References

External links

High schools in Pennsylvania
Educational institutions established in 1969
1969 establishments in Pennsylvania